Adama (Oromo:  or , Amharic: አዳማ), formerly Nazreth, is a city in the central Oromia Region of Ethiopia.

Overview
Adama is a busy transportation center. The city is situated along the road that connects Addis Ababa with Dire Dawa. A large number of trucks use this same route to travel to and from the seaports of Djibouti and Asseb (though the latter is not currently used by Ethiopia, following the Eritrean-Ethiopian War). Additionally, the new Addis Ababa-Djibouti Railway runs through Adama.

Adama Science and Technology University (ASTU) (formerly Nazareth Technique College) is located in Adama. Adama Stadium is the home of Adama City FC, a member of the Ethiopian Football Federation league.

History
The city name Adama may have been derived from the Oromo word , which means a cactus or a cactus-like tree. More specifically,  means Euphorbia candelabrum, a tree of the spurge family, while  would mean Indian fig.
Following World War II, Emperor Haile Selassie renamed the town after Biblical Nazareth, and this name was used for the remainder of the twentieth century. In 2000, the city officially reverted to its original Oromo name, Adama, though Nazareth is still widely used.

In 2000, the government moved the regional capital of Oromia from Addis Ababa to Adama, sparking considerable controversy. Critics of the move believed that the Ethiopian government wished to deemphasize Addis Ababa's location within Oromia. On the other hand, the government maintained that Addis Ababa "has been found inconvenient from the point of view of developing the language, culture and history of the Oromo people".

On 10 June 2005, the Oromo Peoples' Democratic Organization (OPDO), part of the ruling EPRDF coalition, officially announced plans to move the regional capital back to Addis Ababa.

Demographics

Based on the 2007 Census conducted by the Central Statistical Agency of Ethiopia (CSA), this city has a total population of 220,212, an increase of 72.25% over the population recorded in the 1994 census, of whom 108,872 are men and 111,340 women. With an area of 29.86 square kilometers, Adama has a population density of 7,374.82; all are urban inhabitants. A total of 60,174 households were counted in this city, which results in an average of 3.66 persons to a household, and 59,431 housing units. The four largest ethnic groups reported in Adama were the Oromo (39.02%), the Amhara (34.53%), the Gurage (11.98%) and the Silte (5.02%); all other ethnic groups made up 9.45% of the population. Amharic was spoken as a first language by 59.25%, 26.25% spoke Oromo and 6.28% spoke Guragiegna; the remaining 8.22% spoke all other primary languages reported. The majority of the inhabitants said they practiced Ethiopian Orthodox Christianity, with 63.62% of the population reporting they observed this belief, while 24.7% of the population were Muslim, and 10.57% were Protestant.

The 1994 national census reported this town had a total population of 127,842 of whom 61,965 were males and 65,877 were females.

Transport
Adama is a busy transportation center. The city is situated along the road that connects Addis Ababa with Dire Dawa. A large number of trucks use this same route to travel to and from the seaports of Djibouti and Asseb (though the latter is not currently used by Ethiopia, following the Eritrean-Ethiopian War). Additionally, the new Addis Ababa-Djibouti Railway runs through Adama.

Education 
The Adama University was founded in 1993.

Places of worship 
Among the places of worship, they are predominantly Christian churches and temples (Oriental Orthodox: Ethiopian Orthodox Tewahedo Church, Protestant: Ethiopian Evangelical Church Mekane Yesus, Evangelical Christian: Kale Heywet Word of Life Church, Full Gospel Believers Church, Catholic: Ethiopian Catholic Archeparchy of Addis Abeba). There are also Muslim mosques.

Sport
Adama Stadium is the home of Adama City FC, a member of the Ethiopian Football Federation league.

Climate
Köppen-Geiger climate classification system classifies its climate as tropical wet and dry (Aw).

Twin towns – sister cities

Adama is twinned with:
 Aurora, United States
 Sivas, Turkey

References

Further reading
Briggs, Philip. Guide to Ethiopia. Old Saybrook, Connecticut: Globe Pequot Press, 1995.

External links
Adama Chamber of Commerce

Cities and towns in Oromia Region
Ethiopia
Cities and towns in Ethiopia